My Redbreast (Sorrowfully, very sorrowfully comedy) is a 2012 play by Georgian playwright Miho Mosulishvili.

Plot
Sopho returns from America, where she has been for the last twelve years, for the anniversary of her husband's death. She finds that her school friend, Shoka, is pregnant. Moreover, it turns out that her husband, Chito, has not died. He married Shoka and his tombstone in their yard was just a means of extorting money from Sopho. The husband, friend and even her son Toko cheated Sopho to take money from her and pay for the interest for the apartment, which they had put in the bank. They are alarmed by Sopho's unexpected arrival.

Sopho decides not to go back to America, although Toko manages to bring to Georgia old Baxter, whom his mother was taking care in the States. He wants his mother to take care of him in Georgia, so as not to lose money. Sopho refuses to look after Baxter and makes her family members care for him in order to punish the idlers Chito, Shoka and Toko. Baxter intends to propose to Sopho, but since she was supporting the idlers, he concludes that she is like them.

In the final scene the characters are close to the Celestial Court. Their roles change - Sopho and Baxter care for Chito, Shoka and Toko who are confined to invalid chairs. Baxter names Sopho as "My redbreast" (the source of the play's title).

Characters
 Sopho — Chito's first wife, age 42
 Chito — The speculator, Valiko Chitorelidze, age 44
 Shoka — Chito's second wife, age 42
 Toko — Chito's son, age 27
 Baxter O'Sullivan — age 69
 Alice O'Sullivan — daughter of Baxter O'Sullivan, age 35

Production
 July 12, 2013 — Municipal Theatre of Bolnisi (Georgia), Director Zurab Khvedelidze
 June 5, 2014 — Marjanishvili State Academic Drama Theatre (Georgia), Director Khatuna Milorava
 February 26, 2016 — Vaso Godziashvili Municipal Theatre of Velistsikhe (Georgia), Director Omar Kakabadze
 May 17, 2016 — Khulo State Drama Theatre (Georgia), Director Gega Kurtsikidze

Publication
 October 2, 2015 — Glosa Publishing, Tbilisi, Total Pages: 84. 
 December 15, 2016 - 'Mana Sarkanrīklīte (Skumja, ļoti skumja komēdija)', Vītola publishing, Latvia, Translated from Georgian into Latvian by Nino Jakobidze

References
Notes

External links
 My Redbreast
 9 Plays VS Violence

2012 plays
Plays based on real people
Works by Miho Mosulishvili